Libania Grenot Martinez (born 12 July 1983) is a Cuban-born Italian former athlete specialising in the 400 metres. Two times European champion (2014, 2016), she holds the Italian records in the 200 and 400 metres.

Biography
Born in Santiago de Cuba on 12 July 1983, Grenot started running at the age of 9. In 2003-05, she was a Cuban champion in the 400 metres. In 2006, she married an Italian man and relocated to Casal Palocco, a XXXIV zone of Rome.

Grenot acquired Italian citizenship in 2008, and that same year, she broke an Italian record in the 400 meters with a time of 51.05 s and then 50.83 seconds. The latter performance took place at the Beijing Olympics during the semi-final, but despite this effort she did not reach the final. In 2009, she won a gold medal in the distance at the XVI Mediterranean Games with a time of 50.30 s, a new Italian record.

In 2014, she won a gold medal in the 400 metres at the European Championships, becoming the first Italian woman to win an international track title since 1938. Grenot repeated this achievement two years later.

Statistics

International competitions

National titles
Grenot won seven national championships at individual senior level (six as Italian, three as Cuban).

Italian Athletics Championships
200 m: 2012 (1)
400 m: 2009, 2010, 2014, 2015, 2016 (5)
Cuban Athletics Championships
400 m: 2003, 2004, 2005 (3)

See also
 Italian all-time lists - 400 metres
 Italian all-time lists - 200 metres
 Italian national track relay team

Notes

References

External links
 

1983 births
Living people
Cuban female sprinters
Italian female sprinters
Sportspeople from Santiago de Cuba
Athletes (track and field) at the 2003 Pan American Games
Athletes (track and field) at the 2008 Summer Olympics
Athletes (track and field) at the 2012 Summer Olympics
Athletes (track and field) at the 2016 Summer Olympics
Olympic athletes of Italy
Cuban emigrants to Italy
Naturalised citizens of Italy
Athletics competitors of Fiamme Gialle
World Athletics Championships athletes for Italy
World Athletics Championships athletes for Cuba
Pan American Games competitors for Cuba
European Athletics Championships medalists
Mediterranean Games gold medalists for Italy
Mediterranean Games silver medalists for Italy
Athletes (track and field) at the 2009 Mediterranean Games
Athletes (track and field) at the 2013 Mediterranean Games
Athletes (track and field) at the 2018 Mediterranean Games
Mediterranean Games medalists in athletics
Italian Athletics Championships winners
Olympic female sprinters